The 2013 Tour of Hainan was the eighth edition of the Tour of Hainan cycling stage race. It was rated as a 2.HC event on the UCI Asia Tour, and was held between 20 and 28 October 2013, in Hainan. It was won by Moreno Hofland, in his first professional victory ever. Hofland won 3 stages, his teammate Theo Bos won the other six; it was the first time that a cycling team won all stages and the general classification in a UCI HC event.

Teams
Eighteen teams competed in the 2013 Tour of Hainan. These included one UCI ProTour teams, four UCI Professional Continental teams, and national teams representing the Ukraine, China and Hongkong.

The teams that participated in the race were:

Quantec-Indeland

Ukraine national team

Atlas Personal–Jakroo

Hongkong national team

MAX Success Sports
Chinese national team
Hainan Yindongli Cycling Team

Race overview

Classification leadership

References

External links

Tour of Hainan
Tour of Hainan
Tour of Hainan